Renčišov is a village and municipality in Sabinov District in the Prešov Region of north-eastern Slovakia.

History
In historical records the village was first mentioned in 1389.

Geography
The municipality lies at an altitude of 627 metres and covers an area of 8.861 km2. It has a population of about 177 people + Peťo

External links
http://www.statistics.sk/mosmis/eng/run.html

Villages and municipalities in Sabinov District